Cliff Owen (22 April 1919 – November 1993) was a British film and TV director best known for his comedy The Wrong Arm of the Law which starred Peter Sellers. He also directed two of the three films, made in the mid-1960s, featuring the double act Morecambe and Wise, and the big-screen version of the BBC sitcom, Steptoe and Son. 

Owen was born in London. He died in Oxfordshire in November 1993 aged 74.

Selected filmography
Brighton Rock (1947) - 3rd assistant director
Noose (1947) - 2nd assistant director
Under Capricorn (1949) - 2nd assistant director
The Hasty Heart (1949) - 3rd assistant director
Landfall (1949) - 2nd assistant director
The Magic Box (1951) - assistant director
Young Wives' Tale (1951) - 2nd assistant director
Castle in the Air (1952) - assistant director
Father's Doing Fine (1952) - assistant director
The Yellow Balloon (1953) - assistant director
Valley of Song (1953) - assistant director
London Playhouse  (1955) (TV series) - director
The Seventh Dungeon (1955) (TV movie) - director
Boyd Q.C. (1956) (TV series) - director
The New Adventures of Martin Kane (1957) (TV series) - director
Shadow Squad (1957-59) (TV series) - producer
ITV Play of the Week (1958-61) (TV series) - director
The Third Man (1959) (TV series) - director
Knight Errant Limited (1959) (TV series) - director
On Trial (1960) (TV series) - director
 Offbeat (1961) - director
On Trial: The Dilke Case (1961) - director
Drama 61-67 (1962) (TV series) - producer, director
 A Prize of Arms (1962) - director
 The Wrong Arm of the Law (1963) - director
The Victorians (1963) (TV series) - director
A Little Big Business (1964) (TV series) - director
The Sullavan Brothers (1964) (TV series) - director
Melina Mercouri's Greece (1965) (documentary) - director
 That Riviera Touch (1966) - director
 Welcome, Mr. Beddoes aka A Man Could Get Killed (1966) - co-director
 The Magnificent Two (1967) - director
The Vengeance of She (1968) - director
The Avengers (1968) (TV series) - director
Rogues' Gallery  (1968-69) (TV series) - director
ITV Playhouse (1969) (TV series) - director
Confession (1970) (TV series) - director
The Adventures of Don Quick (1970) (TV series) - director
 Steptoe and Son (1972) - director
 Ooh... You Are Awful (1972) - director
 No Sex Please, We're British (1973) - director
Closed Up-Tight (1975) - director
 The Bawdy Adventures of Tom Jones (1976) - director

References

External links

Cliff Owen at BFI

1919 births
1993 deaths
British film directors